The Venezuela Open or Abierto de Venezuela is a men's professional golf tournament. It has only been staged intermittently since 1957, 2019 being the 35th edition of the event. Al Geiberger, Art Wall Jr., David Graham, Roberto De Vicenzo and Tony Jacklin are past champions.

Since 2014, the Venezuela Open has been a fixture on the PGA Tour Latinoamérica Developmental Series. From 1979 to 2009 it made frequent appearances on the South American Tour, later known as the Tour de las Américas. Between 1961 and 1973 the tournament was a regular stop on the PGA-sponsored Caribbean Tour, when it was called the Caracas Open or Caracas Open Invitational. The second event in 1957 was co-sponsored by the PGA.

The event has generally been played at three venues in Caracas: Caracas Country Club, Valle Arriba Golf Club and Lagunita Country Club. In 1999 it was held at Izcaragua Country Club, a short distance east of Caracas while in 2000 it was played at Barquisimeto Golf Club near Barquisimeto.

Winners

Source:

Notes

References

External links
Venezuela Golf Federation
Tour de las Americas official site

Golf tournaments in Venezuela
Tour de las Américas events